Miriquidica is a genus of lichen in the  family Lecanoraceae. The genus was circumscribed in 19876 by lichenologists Hannes Hertel and Gerhard Rambold, with Miriquidica complanata assigned as the type species. According to Dictionary of the Fungi (10th edition, 2008), the widespread genus contains 23 species, found predominantly in arctic-alpine regions.

Species
Miriquidica aeneovirens 
Miriquidica atrofulva 
Miriquidica complanata 
Miriquidica deusta 
Miriquidica effigurata 
Miriquidica garovaglii 
Miriquidica griseoatra 
Miriquidica gyrizans  – Alaska
Miriquidica intrudens 
Miriquidica invadens 
Miriquidica leucophaea 
Miriquidica lulensis 
Miriquidica majae 
Miriquidica nigroleprosa 
Miriquidica paanaensis 
Miriquidica pycnocarpa 
Miriquidica scotopholis 
Miriquidica squamulosa 
Miriquidica stellata 
Miriquidica subplumbea 
Miriquidica verrucariicola 
Miriquidica yunnanensis

References

Lecanoraceae
Lichen genera
Lecanorales genera
Taxa described in 1987
Taxa named by Hannes Hertel